Sowa Chiefdom is a chiefdom in Pujehun District of Sierra Leone. Its capital is Bandajuma.

References 

Chiefdoms of Sierra Leone
Southern Province, Sierra Leone